Ali Saeedlou (born 10 October 1952 in Tabriz) is an Iranian politician who was the Head of Physical Education Organization from 2009 to 2011. Before that, he was Deputy Mayor of Tehran from 2003 to 2005 under Mahmoud Ahmadinejad and had served as his interim successor until the election of Mohammad Bagher Ghalibaf as new mayor.

Early life
He was born on 10 October 1952 in Tabriz, East Azerbaijan Province. He was graduated in 1975 from Tabriz University and then he moved to United States but returned to his hometown in 1980.

Political career
His first political career starts in 1982, when he was appointed as a financial deputy at Ministry of Commerce. He was chosen as Deputy Minister of Commerce two years later and later as Deputy Minister of Cooperatives. In 1990, he was appointed as head of Iranian Department of Defence which he held most of his political years there, serves as its head until 2002. After 2003 local elections which led to victory of Mahmoud Ahmadinejad as Mayor of Tehran, Saeedlou was elected as his deputy. Ahmadinejad later was elected as President and Saeedlou serves as Acting Mayor of Tehran from 3 August to 17 September 2005. He was proposed as Minister-designated of Petroleum by Ahmadinejad in 2005, but he was not confirmed by Parliament of Iran. In August 2009, Saeedlou was appointed by Ahmadinejad as head of the Physical Education Organization, a post he held until August 2011.

See also
Mahmoud Ahmadinejad

References

1952 births
Living people
People from Tabriz
Mayors of Tehran
Heads of Physical Education Organization
University of Tabriz alumni
Vice Presidents of Iran for Executive Affairs